Kamina is a city in the Democratic Republic of the Congo.

Kamina may also refer to:

Places 
 Kamina Barracks, Tamale, Ghana
 Kamina Territory, Democratic Republic of the Congo
 Kamina Air Base
 Kamina Airport
 University of Kamina

Arts and entertainment 
 A character in the anime series Gurren Lagann
 Kamina Ayato, a character in the anime/manga series RahXephon

People with the given name 
 Kamina Jain (born 1969), Canadian sprint kayaker
 Kamina Johnson Smith (fl. 2016–2017), Jamaican attorney and politician

See also
 Kaminak Lake, Kivalliq Region, Nunavut, Canada
 Kaminey, a 2009 Indian film by Vishal Bhardwaj
 Kamineni (disambiguation)